Clips is a mobile video editing software application created by Apple Inc. It was released onto the iOS App Store on April 6, 2017, for free. Initially, it was only available on 64-bit devices running iOS 10.3 or later; as of version 3.1.3, it requires iOS 16.0 or later. Apple describes it as an app for "making and sharing fun videos with text, effects, graphics, and more.".

Features 
After launching of the app, the user sees the view of the front-facing camera. The app allows the user to create a new clip by tapping on a red record button, or use photos or videos from the device's photo library. Once a clip is recorded, it can be added to a project timeline shown at the bottom of the screen. The user can share their project on social media platforms. The user can also add filters and effects to the project. "Live Titles" (available in several styles) can also be created by dictating to the device.

See also 
 iMovie
 List of photo and video apps

References 

Video editing software
IOS software
IOS-based software made by Apple Inc.
2017 software